Lava Tree State Monument is a public park located  southeast of Pāhoa in the Puna District on the island of Hawaii.
It preserves lava molds of the tree trunks that were formed when a lava flow swept through a forested area in 1790.

Park Information

Features
A  footpath forms a loop through the park.
Like all Hawaii state parks, there is no charge for parking and entry. Facilities include restrooms, picnic tables, and 3 covered structures to provide refuge from the rain or  sun. It is open daily during daylight hours only, since there are no lights on the path.
No camping, and no mountain bikes are allowed in the park. There are no water fountains at the park; bring your own water. Although there is a paved path, tree roots have lifted and separated parts of the path so toddlers and the elderly may need assistance.

Directions
From the Hawaii Belt Road (State Route 11), take Highway 130, known as Keaau-Pāhoa Road, toward the town of Pāhoa.
Bypass the first intersection that would take you into Pāhoa by staying to the left. Continue to the traffic light where Pāhoa Bypass Road, Keaau-Pāhoa Rd and Pāhoa-Kapoho roads meet.
At this intersection, make a left onto Highway 132, Pāhoa-Kapoho Road.
The park is located on your right, about  down Lava Tree Road.

History
The land was once part of the extensive ranch of William Herbert Shipman.
Although ancient Hawaiians knew the molds were from a lava flow, one of the first to propose that they were from former trees was Rufus Anderson Lyman.

It was closed in May 2018 due to the eruption of Kīlauea when lava flows approached the park.

Gallery

References

External links
Official site
"Tree Molds" USGS Photo Glossary page
Lava Tree State Park on Hawaiiweb.com (archived)

State parks of Hawaii
Protected areas of Hawaii (island)
Individual trees in Hawaii